In tennis, the Grand Slam tournaments, the Masters series tournaments, the ATP Finals, and the Olympic Games are considered the top-tier events in men's tennis. This article lists their respective doubles champions since the inception of the ATP Tour in 1990.

Champions list

Statistics

Titles leaders 
The leaders in these tournaments since 1990 are (10+ total titles):
 Important note: by setting 1990 as the cut-off point, this list excludes many notable champions in high level tournaments from the previous years. Totals including titles won before 1990 are in brackets.
Active players and records since 1990 are denoted in bold.

Big titles sweep 

Players who won all four Grand Slam titles, the Olympic gold medal, Tour Finals and all 9 Masters tournaments over the course of their careers.
 The event at which the Big titles sweep was completed indicated in bold.

See also 
List of ATP Tour top-level tournament singles champions
List of Grand Slam men's doubles champions
List of Tennis Masters Series doubles champions
List of Olympic medalists in tennis
List of WTA Tour top-level tournament singles champions
List of WTA Tour top-level tournament doubles champions

Notes

References 

ATP Tour
ATP
ATP
champions
ATP Tour